The Road to Calvary is a Russian 12-episode television miniseries from 2017.  It is based on the eponymous trilogy of novels of the Soviet writer Alexei Tolstoy and directed by Konstantin Khudyakov.

The first run began on November 27, 2017 at 21:40 on NTV in Russia.  The series was available on Netflix with English subtitles but Netflix seems to have pulled it as of September 2020.

Plot
The series covers the years 1914-1919. The action begins before the outbreak of World War I. Society is in anticipation of major change. In the center of the story are the Bulavina sisters: Katya and Dasha. The girls share a love for the decadent poet Alexei Bessonov, who changes their worldview and way of thinking, predicting the end of Russia.

The first world war brings new experiences to the serene existence of the Bulavin-Smokovnikov family. After the war and revolution, the ways of the sisters diverge. Katerina Bulavina falls in love with the white officer Vadim Roshchin.

Cast
Anna Chipovskaya — Darya Dmitrievna Bulavina
Yuliya Snigir — Ekaterina Dmitrievna Smokovnikova
Leonid Bichevin — Ivan Ilich Telegin
Pavel Trubiner — Vadim Petrovich Roshchin
Svetlana Khodchenkova — Liza Rastorgueva
Andrey Merzlikin — Arkady Zhadov
Anton Shagin — Alexey Alexeevich Bessonov (prototype — Alexander Blok)
Alexey Kolgan — Nikolai Ivanovich Smokovnikov, lawyer, husband of Catherine
Sergey Koltakov — Dmitry Bulavin, doctor, father of Daria and Catherine
Yevgeny Tkachuk — Sergey Sapozhkov
Aleksandr Yatsenko — Alexey Krasilnikov
Lyubov Aksyonova — Ganna
Roman Madyanov — Olovyannikov
Dmitri Dyuzhev — Mamont Dalsky
Yevgeny Stychkin — Nestor Makhno
Sergei Puskepalis — General Romanovsky
Andrei Chernyshov — Ivan Sorokin
Roman Kurtsyn — Mishka Solomin
Aleksandr Galibin — Boris Savinkov
Vasily Shchipitsyn — Lenin
Petr Rykov — Zhukov
Maxim Stoyanov — Dmitro

References

External links

Russian television miniseries
2017 Russian television series debuts
2017 Russian television series endings
Russian drama television series
2010s Russian television series
NTV (Russia) original programming
Television series set in the 1910s
Works about the Russian Revolution
Cultural depictions of Vladimir Lenin
Cultural depictions of Nestor Makhno